Jack Elvyn Barrett (18 February 1910 – 22 May 1983) was a British actor on film, television and stage, best known for his roles as Smellie Ibbotson in The Dustbinmen and Hylda Baker's father in Not On Your Nellie.

Biography 
Born in Rochdale in 1910, Barrett worked in a family business there, and in the 1930s began working in the theatre. He started as an assistant stage manager, and at different times worked as an actor, stage manager, director and actor-manager. Before and during World War II he produced and acted in local productions in Rochdale. Following the war, he joined weekly repertory companies across England, working in places such as Birmingham, Rugby, Bexhill-on-Sea and Hastings in Sussex, Portsmouth in Hampshire, Bournemouth in Dorset, and Burnley in Lancashire.
In the mid 1950s, he made his first appearances on screen and thereafter had frequent roles on television and in films. In the 1960s and 1970s, he acted in London at the Royal Court Theatre, Savoy Theatre and the National Theatre under directors like William Gaskill, Michael Wearing, Lindsay Anderson, Richard Eyre and Bill Bryden.

The Daily Mirror wrote in 1976 that Barrett, then aged 66, "has the sort of career that makes him the envy of many younger actors". In 1968, he played the lead role in a revival of D. H. Lawrence's play A Collier's Friday Night, with reviewers saying, "The director, Peter Gill, elicits admirable style and even ensemble from a first-rate cast including John Barrett as the collier, Anne Dyson as his wife, Victor Henry as the son, and Jenifer Armitage as Maggie." "The characters have the ring of truth about them. Old Lambert (John Barrett) is marked physically and mentally by his work at the coalface. ... All are excellently portrayed in this first-rate production." In 1970, Barrett played the lead role in Barry Hines's play Billy's Last Stand. One reviewer wrote, "Both John Barrett as Billy and Ian McKellen as Darkly give powerful performances, each sombre, thoughtful, balanced and real, though, by the end, the melodrama seems even to have seeped through to their performances." Another said, "The acting is first-rate. ... John Barrett is wonderfully solid and self-satisfied at the start as an innocent faced by capitalism; and in his final gritty resignation to his fate the actor never puts an eyelid wrong."

Filmography

Film

Television

Selected stage performances

References

External links
 

1910 births
1983 deaths
People from Rochdale
British male film actors
20th-century British male actors